The 2021 UEFA Champions League final was the final match of the 2020–21 UEFA Champions League, the 66th season of Europe's premier club football tournament organised by UEFA, and the 29th season since it was renamed from the European Cup to the UEFA Champions League. It was played at the Estádio do Dragão in Porto, Portugal on 29 May 2021, between English clubs Manchester City, in their first European Cup final, and 2012 winners Chelsea. This was the third all-English final in the competition, after the 2008 and 2019 finals.

The final was originally scheduled to be played at the Krestovsky Stadium in Saint Petersburg, Russia. However, due to the postponement and relocation of the 2020 final to Lisbon as a result of the COVID-19 pandemic in Europe, the final hosts were shifted back a year, with the Atatürk Olympic Stadium in Istanbul, Turkey instead planning to host the 2021 final. Two weeks before the final, UEFA announced that it would be relocated to Porto to allow a limited number of fans to attend the match. A capacity limit of 33% was agreed for the 50,000-seater Estádio do Dragão, resulting in an attendance of 14,110.

Chelsea won the final 1–0 for their second UEFA Champions League title, with Kai Havertz scoring the only goal of the game late in the first half. As winners, they earned the right to play against the winners of the 2020–21 UEFA Europa League, Villarreal, in the 2021 UEFA Super Cup, and also qualified for the 2021 FIFA Club World Cup, both of which they won.

Teams
In the following table, finals until 1992 were in the European Cup era, since 1993 were in the UEFA Champions League era.

Venue

The match was the fourth European Cup/Champions League final to take place in Portugal, and the first to take place outside Lisbon, which previously hosted finals in 1967 at the Estádio Nacional and in 2014 and 2020 at the Estádio da Luz. This was the first time the European Cup/Champions League final took place in the same country in successive seasons. The Estádio do Dragão previously hosted matches at UEFA Euro 2004 and the 2019 UEFA Nations League Finals. Additionally, this final was the first since 2004 to be held in a stadium with capacity lower than 60,000.

Initial host selection

An open bidding process was launched on 22 September 2017 by UEFA to select the venues of the finals of the UEFA Champions League, UEFA Europa League, and UEFA Women's Champions League in 2020. Associations had until 31 October 2017 to express interest, and bid dossiers must be submitted by 1 March 2018. Associations hosting matches at UEFA Euro 2020 were not allowed to bid for the 2020 UEFA Champions League final.

UEFA announced on 3 November 2017 that two associations had expressed interest in hosting the 2020 UEFA Champions League final.

The Atatürk Olympic Stadium was selected by the UEFA Executive Committee during their meeting in Kyiv on 24 May 2018.

On 17 June 2020, the UEFA Executive Committee announced that due to the postponement and relocation of the 2020 final to the Estádio da Luz, Istanbul would instead host the 2021 final.

Relocation to Porto
Due to the COVID-19 pandemic in Turkey, Premier League side Aston Villa offered to have Villa Park in Birmingham as the venue for the Champions League final instead of Istanbul to hold 8,000 English fans, which could be affected by travel limitations. Villa Park has previously hosted the 1999 Cup Winners' Cup Final, the last final of that UEFA competition. It also hosted the 2012 FA Community Shield, also contested between Manchester City and Chelsea, due to Wembley Stadium – England's national stadium – hosting the Olympic football tournament finals in the previous days, being picked in part because of its equidistance between Manchester and London. On 7 May 2021, Secretary of State for Transport Grant Shapps advised against any fans traveling to Turkey for the game.

In negotiations with the Department for Digital, Culture, Media and Sport, UEFA would only consider Wembley as a potential venue within the United Kingdom, and required guarantees that their officials, sponsors and journalists would be exempt from the UK COVID-19 travel restrictions. The British Government was unable to agree to this, and on 13 May 2021, UEFA announced the final was relocated to the Estádio do Dragão in Porto, Portugal, a country that was on the British "green list" for unrestricted travel during the pandemic.

Background
Manchester City were playing in their first European Cup/UEFA Champions League final. They had previously played in one European final, the 1970 European Cup Winners' Cup Final, and won. They became the ninth distinct English side to play in a European Cup/UEFA Champions League final. This was the third UEFA Champions League final for manager Pep Guardiola, and his first since the two wins with Barcelona in 2009 and 2011, both against Manchester United. City were seeking to become the first club to win its first European Cup/UEFA Champions League final since Borussia Dortmund in 1997, which seven clubs had failed to do in between.

Chelsea were playing in their third European Cup/UEFA Champions League final, and the first since their win in 2012 away against Bayern Munich. In addition, they had previously played in the UEFA Cup Winners' Cup and UEFA Europa League finals twice each – winning all. In addition, Chelsea became the first club ever to see its men's and women's teams reach the Champions League final in the same season, having qualified for the 2021 UEFA Women's Champions League final as well. Head coach Thomas Tuchel became the first manager to reach the European Cup/UEFA Champions League final in successive seasons with different clubs, having lost the 2020 final to Bayern Munich while coaching Paris Saint-Germain.

This was the third all-English final in the history of the competition, after 2008 in Moscow between Chelsea and Manchester United and 2019 in Madrid between Liverpool and Tottenham Hotspur. This was also the third consecutive Champions League final to feature a first-time finalist, after Tottenham in 2019 and Paris Saint-Germain in 2020.

This was the third meeting between the teams in Europe, having previously met in the semi-finals of the 1970–71 European Cup Winners' Cup, where Chelsea won both legs 1–0 en route to their first European trophy. It was also the second major cup final between them, after the 2019 EFL Cup Final, which City won on penalties following a goalless draw after extra time. The teams met twice during the season's Premier League, with each side winning away: City won the first match 3–1 at Stamford Bridge, while Chelsea won the second 2–1 at Etihad Stadium three weeks before the final. Three weeks before the second league encounter, Chelsea also beat City 1–0 in the FA Cup semi-finals, denying City the chance of winning an unprecedented quadruple.

Road to the final

Note: In all results below, the score of the finalist is given first (H: home; A: away).

Notes

Pre-match

Officials

On 12 May 2021, UEFA named Spaniard Antonio Mateu Lahoz as the referee for the final. Mateu Lahoz had been a FIFA referee since 2011, and was previously the fourth official in the 2019 UEFA Champions League final. He officiated six prior matches in the 2020–21 Champions League season, with one match in the play-off round, four in the group stage and one quarter-final leg. He served as a referee at the 2018 FIFA World Cup in Russia, and was selected as an official for UEFA Euro 2020. He was joined by six of his fellow countrymen, including assistant referees Pau Cebrián Devís and Roberto Díaz Pérez del Palomar. Carlos del Cerro Grande served as the fourth official, while Alejandro Hernández Hernández acted as the video assistant referee. Juan Martínez Munuera and Íñigo Prieto López de Cerain were appointed as assistant VAR officials, along with Polish referee Paweł Gil.

Opening ceremony
American DJ and electronic music producer Marshmello performed a virtual show for the opening ceremony before the match, along with Selena Gomez and Khalid.

Match

Summary
The match kicked off around 8 p.m. in front of a crowd of 14,110. In the fourth minute, Kai Havertz played the ball across the Manchester City penalty area but it was gathered by Ederson. Five minutes later, a long kick from Ederson found Sterling, who controlled the ball and was about to shoot when he was dispossessed by Reece James. Havertz then passed to Werner, who missed the ball from close range when attempting to shoot. In the 15th minute, Mason Mount passed to Werner, who shot straight at Ederson, before then seeing a subsequent strike tipped away for a corner. Ben Chilwell played in a cross to the far post but N'Golo Kante's header went over the Manchester City bar. In the 28th minute, Phil Foden was played in on goal and was about to shoot when Antonio Rüdiger tackled him. Two minutes later, Kyle Walker sent the ball across the Chelsea penalty area but it fizzed just out of Mahrez's reach. With ten minutes of the half remaining, İlkay Gündoğan became the first player to be booked after a foul on Mount.

In the 38th minute, Kante played the ball to Havertz, who was denied a shooting opportunity by a tackle from Oleksandr Zinchenko. A minute later, Chelsea were forced to make the first substitution of the match with the injured Thiago Silva being replaced by Andreas Christensen. Three minutes before half-time, Chelsea took the lead. Mount passed to Havertz, who went one-on-one with Ederson, and although the goalkeeper rushed out and deflected the ball away, Havertz passed it into an empty net to make it 1–0. There were three minutes of stoppage time.

Neither side made any lineup changes during the interval. Manchester City dominated the early stages of the second half. Twelve minutes into the half, Rüdiger was booked for a foul on City's Kevin De Bruyne, who was injured in the challenge, leaving the pitch due to the new concussion protocol, in tears, to be replaced by Gabriel Jesus. Two minutes later, Manchester City appealed for a penalty when the ball struck James on the arm in his own penalty area, but the VAR review decided against a foul, noting that the ball deflecting off James' chest first. In the 64th minute, Bernardo Silva was replaced by Fernandinho for Manchester City before Christian Pulisic came on for Werner for Chelsea.

With 21 minutes remaining, City pressed for an equalizer. Mahrez's cross to Gündoğan was cleared by César Azpilicueta. Four minutes later, Pulisic flicked the ball to Havertz, who passed it back to Pulisic, but his attempted shot rolled just past the City goalpost. In the 75th minute, Sterling passed to Jesus, but the ball was cleared by Chilwell. Manchester City made their third substitution when Sergio Agüero came on for Sterling. Mateo Kovačić was brought on for Chelsea to replace Mount in the 80th minute, and five minutes later, Agüero attempted to find Foden with a lofted cross to the far post, but the ball was easily caught by Édouard Mendy in the Chelsea goal. A minute later, Walker played a cross-field out-swinging pass that narrowly missed both Agüero and Foden.

Two minutes from the end of the match, Jesus was booked for a foul on Havertz before Christensen made a block to maintain his side's lead. At the end of regular time, the fourth official displayed that a minimum of seven minutes of stoppage would be played. In the final minute, Mahrez's half-volley from the edge of the Chelsea penalty area went just over the crossbar, and the match was brought to an end with Chelsea winning 1–0.

Details
A "home" team was determined, for "administrative purposes," through a special draw held on 19 March 2021, after the quarter-final and semi-final draws.

Statistics

See also
2021 UEFA Europa League Final
2021 UEFA Women's Champions League final
2021 UEFA Super Cup
Chelsea F.C. in international football
English football clubs in international competitions
List of football matches between British clubs in UEFA competitions
Manchester City F.C. in international football

Notes

References

External links

2021
Final
May 2021 sports events in Portugal
Champions League final 2021
Champions League final 2021
2020–21 in English football
2021
International club association football competitions hosted by Portugal
2020–21 in Portuguese football
21st century in Porto